In cooking, syrup (less commonly sirup; from ; , beverage, wine and ) is a condiment that is a thick, viscous liquid consisting primarily of a solution of sugar in water, containing a large amount of dissolved sugars but showing little tendency to deposit crystals. Its consistency is similar to that of molasses. The viscosity arises from the multiple hydrogen bonds between the dissolved sugar, which has many hydroxyl (OH) groups.

Culinary syrup

There are a range of syrups used in food production, including:
 Agave syrup, made from agave stem
 Cane syrup, made from sugar canes
 Chocolate syrup
 Corn syrup
 Glucose syrup
 Golden syrup, a by-product of refining crystallized sugar
 High fructose corn syrup, widely used in the US
 Maple syrup

Common syrups

A variety of beverages call for sweetening to offset the tartness of some juices used in the drink recipes. Granulated sugar does not dissolve easily in cold drinks or ethyl alcohol. Since the following syrups are liquids, they are easily mixed with other liquids in mixed drinks, making them superior alternatives to granulated sugar.

Simple sugar syrups

Inverted sugar syrup

Inverted sugar syrup, also known as simple syrup, is a basic sugar-and-water syrup. It is used by bartenders as a sweetener to make cocktails, and as a yeast feeding agent in ethanol fermentation.

The ratio of sugar to water is 1:1 by volume for normal simple syrup, but can get up to 2:1 for rich simple syrup. For pure sucrose the saturation limit is about 5:1 ( sucrose to  water).

Demerara syrup
Combining demerara sugar, a type of natural brown sugar, with water in this process produces demerara syrup. Sugar substitutes such as honey or agave nectar can also be used to make syrups. Spices can be added to the ingredients during the process, resulting in a spiced simple syrup.

Flavored syrup
Flavored syrups are made by infusing simple syrups with flavoring agents during the cooking process. A wide variety of flavoring agents can be used, often in combination with each other, such as herbs, spices, or aromatics. For instance, syrups' aromatics is prepared by adding certain quantities of orange flavorings and cinnamon water to simple syrup. This type of syrup is commonly used at coffee bars, especially in the United States, to make flavored drinks. Infused simple syrups can be used to create desserts, or add sweetness and depth of flavor to cocktails.

Gomme syrup
Gomme syrup (or gum syrup;  is French for "gum") is inverted sugar syrup added with gum arabic. Gomme syrup is made with the highest ratio of sugar to water possible, while the gum arabic prevents the sugar from crystallizing and adds a smooth texture.

It is an ingredient commonly used in mixed drinks, and as a sweetener for iced coffee in Japan.

Production
Syrups can be made by dissolving sugar in water or by reducing naturally sweet juices such as cane juice, sorghum juice, or maple sap. Corn syrup is made from corn starch using an enzymatic process that converts it to sugars.

A must weight-type refractometer is used to determine the sugar content in the solution.

For fermentation
Syrup is used to feed microbiological life. Syrup consists of carbohydrates and water. Cold drinking water (from tap water (even without a faucet aerator), lakes, etc.) can hold more dissolved oxygen than warm water.

Saccharomyces cerevisiae, is an important yeast in ethanol fermentation and winemaking. S. cerevisiae is able to grow both in the presence and absence of oxygen, but the fermentation rate increases during the stationary phase in the presence of oxygen.

Examples of hydrolyzed sugars with high water ratio used in fermentation:
 Inverted sugar syrup
 Fermented water
 Kombucha is produced by fermenting sugared tea using a symbiotic culture of bacteria and yeast (SCOBY).
 Winemaking kits: Cheap winemaking kits usually instruct that the grape juice should be diluted sucrose (bought separately) should be dissolved in water.

However, concentrated syrups contain little water and thus have little impact in terms of oxygen. For example, glucose syrup containing over 90% glucose is used in industrial fermentation.

See also 

 List of syrups
 Kithul treacle
 Meringue
 Sharbat
 Squash (drink)
 Stevia
 Sugar beet syrup
 Torani
 Vincotto
 Vino cotto

References

External links

 
Drink mixers
Demulcents
Dosage forms
Polymers
Condiments